The surname Henrici is the possessive form of the Latin name "Henricus", i.e. "Henry".

Henrici may refer to:
 Christian Friedrich Henrici, known as Picander (1700–1764), German poet and librettist
 Cornelius Henrici Hoen, known as Honius (died 1524), Dutch jurist and humanist
 Ernst Henrici (1854–1915), German grammar school teacher, writer, colonial adventurer and anti-Semitic politician
 Marguerite Gertrud Anna Henrici (1892-1971), Swiss-born South African plant physiologist
 Olaus Henrici (1840–1918), Mathematics professor in London
 Peter Henrici (mathematician) (1923–1987), Swiss mathematician
 Peter Henrici (born 1928), Swiss priest, philosopher and professor
 Sigfrid Henrici (1889–1964), German general

See also 
 Heinrici